The Upper Saxon Circle was an Imperial Circle of the Holy Roman Empire, created in 1512.

The circle was dominated by the electorate of Saxony (the circle's director) and the electorate of Brandenburg. It further comprised the Saxon Ernestine duchies and Pomerania. The Lusatias that fell to Saxony by the 1635 Peace of Prague were never encircled.

Composition 
The circle was made up of the following states:

Sources 
 The list of states making up the Upper Saxon Circle is based on that in the German Wikipedia article Obersächsischer Reichskreis.

External links

Imperial Circles in the 16th Century – Historical Maps of Germany

 
Circles of the Holy Roman Empire
1512 establishments in the Holy Roman Empire